Alison Sheard (born 21 September 1951) is a South African professional golfer who played on the Ladies European Tour (LET) and LPGA Tour.  During her career, Sheard became the first-non British champion of the Women's British Open in 1979 and won three other LET events.

Amateur career
Sheard was born on 21 September 1951 in Durban, South Africa. At Souuh African golf events held by Golf RSA, Sheard won the SA Women's Stroke Play five times from 1974 to 1979. She also won the SA Women's Amateur back-to-back from 1976 to 1978. Outside of South Africa, Sheard was runner-up at the 1976 British Ladies Amateur. In team events, Sheard was part of the silver medal winning South African team at the 1974 Espirito Santo Trophy.

Professional career
In late 1976, Sheard became a professional golfer and played throughout Europe. Her first wins on the Ladies European Tour were at the Carlsberg and McEwans Welsh Classic tournaments in 1979. That year, Sheard was the leading money winner for the 1979 LET season. In 1980, Sheard joined the LPGA Tour. Between 1980 to 1983, her best performance at the LPGA was a seventh place tie at the 1983 West Virginia LPGA Classic. A few years later, Sheard won an additional LET tournament at the 1985 Spanish Open. 

In major championships, Sheard won the 1979 Women's British Open before it was designated as a major championship in 2001. With her win, Sheard became the first foreign golfer to win the British Open. In later British Opens, she finished 9th at the 1982 edition and tied for 12th at the 1986 edition. From 1980 to 1984, Sheard participated at the Peter Jackson Classic and made the cut three times. Her best finish was at the 1981 Peter Jackson Classic when she tied for 10th place with Jo Ann Washam. In the United States, Sheard was tied for 23rd at the 1980 U.S. Women's Open and missed the cut in the 1983 U.S. Women's Open. Sheard was inducted into the Southern Africa Golf Hall of Fame in 2010.

Ladies European Tour wins (4)
1979 (3) Carlsberg Championship – Sand Moor, Women's British Open, McEwan's Welsh Classic
1985 (1) La Manga Spanish Open
Note: Sheard won the Women's British Open once before it was co-sanctioned by the LPGA Tour in 1994, and recognized as a major championship on the LPGA Tour in 2001

Team appearances
Amateur
Espirito Santo Trophy (representing South Africa): 1974, 1976, 1980

References

South African female golfers
Ladies European Tour golfers
LPGA Tour golfers
Sportspeople from Durban
1951 births
Living people